Davst (salty) is a sum (district) of Uvs Province in western Mongolia, bordering to Russia in the north.

The reason it is called "salty" is that there is the biggest natural salt rock deposit in the country. The sum occupies the northern tip of Uvs Nuur which is 5 times saltier than the ocean.

A border crossing to Khandagayty, Russia is located in the sum.

Populated places in Mongolia
Districts of Uvs Province
Mongolia–Russia border crossings